Saint Dracula 3D is a 2012 film directed by Rupesh Paul. Produced by BizTV Network – the producers of Dam 999, Saint Dracula 3D became the second stereoscopic 3D film to be made on the story of Count Dracula, as Dario Argento had already directed Dracula 3D earlier that year. The film was released in English and Malayalam

Filming
The film was shot in Liverpool, Manchester and Wales in the UK. Director Rupesh Paul along with Sohan Roy, the director of the film Dam 999 completed the movie with a cast and crew from the UK.
The entire movie was shot on camera 'RED' by Frenchman Francois Coppey, the Director of Photography, while the stereography was done by Julian Crivelli. The movie was released in 2012.

As of March 2013, the film was available as a part of the Freestyle Life Film Exhibition.

Cast
Mitch Powell – as Dracula
Patricia Duarte – as Clara
Daniel Shayler – as Benjamin
Suzanne Roche – as Sr. Agnes
Bill Hutchens – as Fr. Nicholson
Carl Wharton – as The Vicar
Michael Christopher – as The Bishop
Anna Burkholder – as Hay
Lawrence Larkin – as FBI Agent Carlo
Nicola Jeanne – as The Mother Superior

Crew
Written & Directed By – Rupesh Paul
Project Designer – Sohan Roy
Producer – BizTV Network
Co-Producer – Prabhiraj.N
Cinematographer – Francois Coppey
Still Photography – John Guy
 Editor- Ajay Devloka
Line Producer – John Guy

Stereographer – Julian Crivelli
Colorist – Sapan Narula
Music – Sreevalsan J Menon
Sound Design – Renjith Viswanathan
Costume Designer – Nichola Parle
Digital Image Technician – Wezley Joao Ferreira
Animal Consultancy – Jakk Tennant

Oscar eligibility
In 2012, the movie was one of 282 feature films eligible for an Oscar Award for Best Picture at the 85th Oscars. Two of the songs as well as the background score of the film were also eligible for the Best Song and Best Original Soundtrack award categories. Saint Dracula 3D was one of two feature films from India to be included in the category, the second one being Akashathinte Niram by Dr Biju.

See also
 Vampire film

References

External links 
 
 

2012 films
Films scored by Sreevalsan J. Menon
Dracula films
Films directed by Rupesh Paul
2010s Malayalam-language films
Films shot in England
Films shot in Wales
2010s English-language films